The 1978 Kent State Golden Flashes football team was an American football team that represented Kent State University  in the Mid-American Conference (MAC) during the 1978 NCAA Division I-A football season. In their first season under head coach Ron Blackledge, the Golden Flashes compiled a 4–7 record (2–6 against MAC opponents), finished in eighth place in the MAC, and were outscored by all opponents by a combined total of 248 to 158.

The team's statistical leaders included Tom Delaney with 440 rushing yards, Tom Delaney with 400 passing yards, and Mike Moore with 250 receiving yards. Three Kent State players were selected as first-team All-MAC players: linebacker Jack Lazor and defensive linemen Mike McKibben and Mike Zele.

Schedule

References

Kent State
Kent State Golden Flashes football seasons
Kent State Golden Flashes football